Ömnögovi is a sum (district) of Uvs Province in western Mongolia.

Part of the sum is desert, that has sand dunes.

Climate

Ömnögovi has a semi-arid climate (Köppen climate classification BSk) with warm summers and severely cold winters. Most precipitation falls in the summer as rain, with some snow in the adjacent months of May and September. Winters are very dry.

References

Populated places in Mongolia
Districts of Uvs Province